Geissanthus ecuadorensis is a species of tree in the family Primulaceae. It is native to Ecuador and Peru. G. ecuadorensis is considered a vulnerable species by the IUCN.

References

ecuadorensis
Vulnerable plants
Trees of Ecuador
Trees of Peru
Taxonomy articles created by Polbot
Plants described in 1902